The Azalea Open Invitational was a golf tournament in North Carolina on the PGA Tour, held at Cape Fear Country Club in Wilmington. Last played in November 1971 as an unofficial event; it was an official PGA Tour event in 1945 and from 1949 through 1970. The Heritage in South Carolina debuted in 1969 and soon displaced it on the schedule.

It was also played under the names of the Azalea Open and the Wilmington Azalea Open; all were centerpieces of the city's Azalea Festival. Cape Fear was designed by noted course architect Donald Ross. 

From 1950 through 1965, the Azalea Open was a tune-up event for the first major of the year, The Masters in Augusta, Georgia. Jerry Barber, the winner of the PGA Championship in 1961, won the Wilmington event three times (1953, 1961, 1963). Arnold Palmer won in 1957 and nearly repeated, falling by a stroke in an 18-hole playoff in 1958; the difference was a penalty stroke he called 

Total prize money was initially $10,000, increasing to $12,500 in 1955 and $15,000 in 1958. It reduced to $12,000 in 1961 before increasing to $20,000 from 1962 to 1964. Prize money was $28,750 in 1965, $22,800 in 1966, $35,000 from 1967 to 1969 and $60,000 in 1970. The final non-tour event in 1971 had prize money of $35,000.

Tournament hosts
1949–1971 – Cape Fear Country Club, Wilmington, North Carolina
1945 – Mobile Country Club, Mobile, Alabama

Winners

Notes

References

External links
Cape Fear Country Club

Former PGA Tour events
Golf in North Carolina
Recurring sporting events established in 1945
Recurring sporting events disestablished in 1971
1945 establishments in Alabama
1971 disestablishments in North Carolina